Joseph Elzead John Gingras (January 10, 1894 – September 6, 1947) was a pitcher in Major League Baseball who played for the Kansas City Packers of the Federal League in its 1915 season.

External links

1894 births
1947 deaths
Asheville Tourists players
Baseball players from New York (state)
Binghamton Bingoes players
Bridgeport Americans players
Elmira Colonels players
Kansas City Packers players
Major League Baseball pitchers
People from Jersey City, New Jersey
Warren Warriors players
Winston-Salem Twins players